Ghare & Baire is a 2018 Bengali language romantic drama film directed by Mainak Bhaumik and produced by Surinder Films Written by Mainak Bhaumik. The film stars Jisshu Sengupta and Koel Mullick in lead roles. The film released theatrically on 30 March 2018.

Plot 
The film explores the concept of love, passion, and separation in a modern context. Amit and Labanya are childhood friends. Years later, Amit returns to Kolkata leaving behind his corporate job in Mumbai to pursue music. He realizes his love for Labanya but is reluctant to profess. On the other hand, Labanya is extremely pressurized by her parents to enter into an arranged marriage with an NRI. Amit experiences heartbreak when Labanya agrees to the arrangement.

Cast 
 Jisshu Sengupta as Amit
 Koel Mullick as Labanya
 Aparajita Adhya as Sohini
 Biswanath Basu as Bonto
 Monami Ghosh as Rukmini
 Tanima Sen
 Swagata Basu
 Joy Sengupta as Sam

Soundtrack

References 

2018 films
Bengali-language Indian films
2010s Bengali-language films
Indian drama films
2018 drama films